Bergsøya is an island in Gjemnes Municipality in Møre og Romsdal county, Norway. The island is located near the junctions of the Freifjorden, Kvernesfjorden, and Tingvollfjorden.

The island is connected to Kristiansund Municipality (to the north) and the mainland part of Gjemnes Municipality by the Krifast network (a network of 2 bridges and 1 undersea tunnel).  It is connected to the mainland in the west by the Gjemnessund Bridge, to the island of Frei (and Kristiansund) to the north by the Freifjord Tunnel, and to the island of Aspøya in Tingvoll Municipality to the east by the Bergsøysund Bridge.  The European route E39 highway runs across the island via the two bridges and Norwegian National Road 70 runs across the island and into the Freifjord Tunnel.

References

Islands of Møre og Romsdal
Gjemnes